Paul Dawson (born January 13, 1993) is an American football linebacker for the Vegas Vipers of the XFL. He was drafted by the Cincinnati Bengals in the third round of the 2015 NFL Draft. He played college football at TCU.

Early years
Dawson is from an area in Dallas, Texas called Pleasant Grove. He graduated in 2011 from Skyline High School. where he was utilized at wide receiver, helping lead Skyline to a 9–3 overall record as a senior, including a 7–0 district record. Dawson finished the year as a top receiver, and nominated to all-conference in the 5A district.

College career
With only a few division one offers as a wide receiver, Dawson decided to attend Trinity Valley Community College instead. There he converted himself to the defense side of the ball, to play linebacker. After showing legitimate potential in his freshman season, he signed to Texas Christian university during his unofficial visit. In 2014, Dawson was named a first team All-American by the Walter Camp Football Foundation as well as USA Today.  Dawson was also named Big 12 Conference Defensive Player of the Year along with being named the most valuable player for TCU. His senior season included 140 tackles, 20 tackles for loss, 4 interceptions, and 5 sacks. In addition with being recognized as the top inside linebacker in the 2015 draft class.

Professional career

Cincinnati Bengals
Dawson was drafted by the Cincinnati Bengals in the third round (99th overall) in the 2015 NFL Draft. Following the selection, Bengals defensive coordinator Paul Guenther compared him to Bengals Pro Bowl linebacker Vontaze Burfict. A projected first round pick entering the draft, Dawson was considered a steal when the Bengals selected him. 
On September 4, 2016, Dawson was waived by the Bengals and was signed to the practice squad. He was promoted to the active roster on December 23, 2016.

On September 2, 2017, Dawson was waived by the Bengals after injuring a bone in his wrist.

Seattle Seahawks
On November 14, 2017, Dawson was signed to the Seattle Seahawks' practice squad. He was promoted to the active roster on December 13, 2017.

On April 16, 2018, Dawson re-signed with the Seahawks. He was waived on May 7, 2018.

Saskatchewan Roughriders
On September 12, 2018, Dawson was signed to the Saskatchewan Roughriders practice squad. He was promoted to the active roster on September 29, 2018.

Vegas Vipers
Dawson was selected in the 7th round of the 2023 XFL Defensive Front Seven Draft, by the Vegas Vipers.

References

External links
 TCU Horned Frogs bio
 Cincinnati Bengals bio

1993 births
Living people
All-American college football players
American football linebackers
Cincinnati Bengals players
Seattle Seahawks players
Saskatchewan Roughriders players
Vegas Vipers players
Players of American football from Dallas
TCU Horned Frogs football players
Trinity Valley Cardinals football players